Ashutosh Saxena is an Indian-American computer scientist, researcher, and entrepreneur known for his contributions to the field of artificial intelligence and robotics. His research interests include deep learning, robotics, and 3-dimensional computer vision. Saxena is the co-founder and CEO of Caspar.AI, which is an artificial intelligence company that automates peoples' homes and builds applications such as fall detectors for senior living. Prior to Caspar.AI, Ashutosh co-founded Cognical Katapult (NSDQ: KPLT), which provides a no credit required alternative to traditional financing for online and omni-channel retail. Before Katapult, Saxena was an assistant professor in the Computer Science Department and faculty director of the RoboBrain Project at Cornell University.

Education 
Saxena received his bachelor's degree in electrical engineering from the Indian Institute of Technology, Kanpur in 2004. In 2009, with artificial intelligence pioneer Andrew Ng as his advisor, Saxena received both his M.S. and Ph.D. in computer science with an emphasis on artificial intelligence from Stanford University.

Career 
In 2003, Ashutosh began his career as a research intern for Bose Corporation, where he developed mathematical models that use electronic circuits to engineer better speakers. Once Ashutosh completed his undergraduate degree, he became a researcher at the Commonwealth Scientific and Industrial Research Organization, where he developed algorithmic models for medical devices. From 2010 to 2013, Saxena was the chief scientist of New York-based Holopad, where he worked with Steven Spielberg's team to create walkthroughs and 3D experiences for his movie TinTin.

Before Caspar, Saxena pursued other entrepreneurial ventures, such as ZunaVision, an artificial intelligence startup he co-founded with Andrew Ng that uses AI to assign advertising space within videos. Ashutosh served as the CTO of ZunaVision from 2008 to 2010. After ZunaVision, Saxena co-founded Cognical Katapult, which provided financing solutions to nonprime and underbanked consumers powered by artificial intelligence. From 2014 to 2016, Saxena served as the faculty director of the RoboBrain project, which was a joint venture that he started between Stanford University, Cornell University, Brown University, and the University of California, Berkeley that made a knowledge engine for robots.

Saxena co-founded Caspar.AI in 2015 with David Cheriton, who serves as chief scientist. Caspar.AI has been widely covered in several outlets including Forbes Japan, and MIT Technology Review. Ashutosh has been recognized for his work by receiving the Alfred P. Sloan Fellow in 2011, Google Faculty Research Award in 2012, Microsoft Faculty Fellowship in 2012, NSF Career award in 2013, One of the Eight Innovators to Watch by the Smithsonian Institution in 2015, and received TR35 Innovator Award by MIT Technology Review in 2018. He was  named by San Francisco Business Times as a 40 under 40 young business leader.

Research 
Saxena has authored over 100 published papers in the areas of deep learning, robotics, and 3D computer vision. His work in the fields of computer vision and deep learning have been featured in press releases and academic journal reviews. Ashutosh's early work includes the Stanford Artificial Intelligence Robot (STAIR) and Make3D, which enables the estimation of depth from a single image. At Cornell University, Ashutosh led the Robot Learning Lab, which used a machine learning approach to train robots to perform tasks in human environments such as generalizing manipulation in 3D point-clouds where robots learn to transfer manipulation trajectories to novel objects utilizing a large sample of demonstrations from crowdsourcing.

References 

Stanford University alumni
Living people
Artificial intelligence researchers
American roboticists
Machine learning researchers
Indian emigrants to the United States
Year of birth missing (living people)